Feliz Navidad is the fourth solo album by Héctor Lavoe, with the contribution of Daniel Santos and Yomo Toro. It was released on 1979, under the label of Fania Records, and Johnny Pacheco was the Recording Director.

Track listing

 "Monserrate" - 3:23 
 "Mr. Brownie" - 4:23 
 "La Parranda Fania" - 4:42 
 "Joven Contra Viejo" - 4:13 
 "En la Navidad" - 3:21 
 "El Lechón de Cachete" - 3:43 
 "Una Pena en Navidad" - 2:54 
 "Dame Un Chance" - 2:49

Personnel
Héctor Lavoe - Vocals, Backing vocals 
Johnny Pacheco - Conga
Milton Cardona - Conga
Yomo Toro - Cuatro
Prof. José Torres - Piano
Sal Cuevas - Bass
Luis Mangual - Bongo
Jimmy Delgado - Timbal
Ray Maldonado - Trumpet
José Febles - Trumpet
José Rodríguez - Trombone
Papo Vázquez - Trombone
Milton Cardona - Backing vocals 
Ramón Rodríguez - Backing vocals

References

External links

1979 albums
Héctor Lavoe albums
Fania Records albums